Jone Samuelsen (born 6 July 1984) is a Norwegian footballer who plays for Storms BK.

Club career
Born in Stavanger, Samuelsen started his professional career with FK Haugesund in the Norwegian first division in 2001, and he was a regular in the Haugesund side throughout 2002 and 2003, during which time he also captained the Norwegian Under-19 international side. He played alongside another talented midfielder, Christian Grindheim.

He was brought to Viking during the 2003 season for more than NOK 2 million (£200,000), the second highest transfer fee ever paid by the club at the time. At Viking he was an instant hit, and he was called up to the Under-21 international squad on several occasions, even playing against the Brazilian U-21 squad among others where he had the responsibility to man-mark Kaká. However, the 2004 and 2005 seasons were less successful as he failed to secure a regular place in the side under Roy Hodgson. However, Vikings former coach Tom Prahl showed faith in him, and Samuelsen was a regular in the team lineup during the 2006 season.

He was also the captain of the U-19 team, and collected the 2002–03 U19 fairplay award on behalf of his country.

He signed for Odd Grenland early in January 2010, for about 100.000 NOK, most of that being paid by Odd Grenlands fan club Oddrane. Because of his hard working style he quickly became a fan favorite.

Samuelsen came to international attention when he scored a header from his own half (into an open goal) in a game against Tromsø IL on 25 September 2011. The club also has plans to nominate his goal to Guinness World Records. It was measured at 57.3 metres by the local police days after the game, and re-measured to 58.13 metres a few days later. On 30 October, Ryujiro Ueda scored the only goal for his team Fagiano Okayama against Yokohama FC with his head from his own half. The distance of (immediately measured to) 58.6 metres was thought to be a new record, but it was re-measured later on to 57.8 metres, giving Samuelsen the record.

On 20 March 2020 it was confirmed, that Samuelsen had joined Storms BK together with his former Odd-teammate Håvard Storbæk.

International career
After an impressive start to the 2014 season, scoring 5 goals in 10 league games from the midfield position, Samuelsen was selected by Per Mathias Høgmo for the friendly matches against France and Russia in May. He made his senior international debut on 27 May 2014, coming on as a late substitute for Mats Møller Dæhli in the game versus France in the Stade de France, a match Norway lost 4–0.

Career statistics

Honours

Individual
Eliteserien Player of the Year: 2014
Eliteserien Midfielder of the Year: 2014

References

External links
 Samuelsen's profile at Odd Ballklubb's official page

1984 births
Living people
Sportspeople from Stavanger
Association football midfielders
Norwegian footballers
Norway international footballers
Norway under-21 international footballers
Norway youth international footballers
Viking FK players
FK Haugesund players
Skeid Fotball players
Odds BK players
Eliteserien players
Norwegian First Division players